Sufan-e Sofla (also Romanized as Sūfān-e Soflá; also known as Soffān-e Pā’īn) is a village in Miyan Ab-e Shomali Rural District, in the Central District of Shushtar County, Khuzestan Province, Iran. At the 2006 census, its population was 251, in 51 families.

References 

Populated places in Shushtar County